Transmembrane protein 94 is a protein that in humans is encoded by the TMEM94 gene.

References

Further reading